Mariupol Cemetery is a cemetery in Taganrog, Rostov Oblast, Russia. It is noted for housing the Chapel of Alexander Nevsky.

Chapel of Alexander Nevsky 
In 2008 in commemoration of the 65th anniversary of the liberation of Rostov region, under an initiative of Abbot Svyato-Troytskovo parish (archpriest Timofey Fetisov), a memorial chapel was built on the Mariupol Cemetery, and dedicated to Alexander Nevsky.

The Chapel of  Saint Warrior-Prince Alexander Nevsky is 15 metres high and is located near the graves of Soviet soldiers and officers on the Walk of Fame. There is a memorial wall with a list of the divisions that liberated Taganrog. Every day, funeral services and requiems for deceased are offered in the chapel, as well as readings from the Psalter.

References

Tourist attractions in Taganrog
Cemeteries in Russia
Chapels in Russia